TRV$DJAM was a collaboration project between Travis Barker of Blink-182 and Adam Goldstein, a.k.a. DJ AM. They performed their first show on June 25, 2008 at the Roxy and released a mix tape online in August 2008 titled Fix Your Face. In June 2009, they released a second mix tape titled Fix Your Face Vol. 2 (Coachella' 09). Hours after performing for thousands of college students on September 19, 2008 in Columbia, South Carolina, Barker and DJ AM were critically injured in a Learjet crash that killed four people.

The artists' collaboration project is now over after their two released mixtapes, due to the death of Goldstein on August 28, 2009 at his apartment in New York City.

Discography
Fix Your Face (2008)
Fix Your Face Vol. 2 - Coachella '09 (2009)

References

External links
TRV$DJAM at Myspace

American drum and bass musical groups
Drum and bass duos
Musical groups from Los Angeles